Carlos David Frías  (born November 13, 1989) is a Dominican former professional baseball pitcher. He played in Major League Baseball (MLB) for the Los Angeles Dodgers.

Career

Los Angeles Dodgers
Frías joined the Los Angeles Dodgers organization as an international free agent in 2007 and began his professional career with the Dominican Summer League Dodgers. He was 6-2 with a 1.81 ERA for the DSL team that year in 13 games and earned a promotion to the U.S. based Gulf Coast Dodgers the following year.

Frías moved up through the Dodgers farm system, appearing for the Arizona League Dodgers in 2009, the Ogden Raptors in 2010 and the Rancho Cucamonga Quakes in 2011. He returned to Ogden in 2012 and then split 2013 among the Quakes, the Great Lakes Loons and the Chattanooga Lookouts. He was selected to the Midwest League All-Star team in 2013 after he had a 4-2 record and 1.86 ERA in the first half of the season and received an invitation to the Dodgers' spring training camp in 2014, but began the season with the Lookouts and was promoted to the AAA Albuquerque Isotopes in May. While with the Isotopes, he was suspended twice during the month of July. He was hit with a 10-game suspension for having a foreign substance on his arm during a game on July 2 and then on July 29, he was suspended seven games for his role in an on-field fight with the Reno Aces. In 16 games with the Isotopes, he was 8–4 with a 5.01 ERA.

Frías was called up to the majors for the first time on August 4, 2014  and made his debut that night, against the Los Angeles Angels of Anaheim, pitching two scoreless innings. Frías made his first major league start on September 3, against the Washington Nationals, pitching six scoreless innings in a game the Dodgers eventually lost in extra innings.

In his second major league start on September 17, 2014, against the Colorado Rockies, Frías became the first pitcher in the modern era to yield 10 hits while logging fewer than three outs. He was pulled in the first inning and charged with 8 runs. The rest of his 15 appearances for the Dodgers were out of the bullpen. Overall, he was 1–1 with a 6.12 ERA in 32.1 innings pitched. He was assigned to the new AAA team, the Oklahoma City Dodgers  to start 2015. He was promoted to the Majors on April 26 and won his first three decisions. However, on May 24 he allowed 10 runs in only four innings of work, tying the Los Angeles Dodgers record for most runs allowed in a game. He made 13 starts (and four relief appearances) for the Dodgers in 2015 and was 5–5 with a 4.06 ERA. He only appeared in one game for the Dodgers in 2016, pitching four scoreless innings of relief on July 7 against the San Diego Padres. He also made eight appearances (four starts) for the Oklahoma City Dodgers with a 3–3 record and 4.46 ERA while spending most of the season on the minor league disabled list. On January 25, 2017, Frías was designated for assignment by the Dodgers.

Cleveland Indians
On January 30, 2017, Frías was traded to the Cleveland Indians in exchange for cash considerations. Frías was designated for assignment on May 16, 2017 to make room on the Indians' roster for Bradley Zimmer; after clearing waivers, he was outrighted to the Triple-A Columbus Clippers. He elected free agency on November 6, 2017. On January 23, 2018, Frias resigned a minor league deal with the Cleveland Indians. He was released on March 29, 2018.

Leones de Yucatán
On April 23, 2018, Frías signed with the Leones de Yucatán of the Mexican Baseball League. He was released on July 23, 2018.

Tigres de Quintana Roo
On February 4, 2019, Frías signed with the Tigres de Quintana Roo of the Mexican League. He was released on May 21, 2019.

References

External links

1989 births
Living people
Albuquerque Isotopes players
Arizona League Dodgers players
Chattanooga Lookouts players
Columbus Clippers players
Dominican Republic expatriate baseball players in Mexico
Dominican Republic expatriate baseball players in the United States
Dominican Summer League Dodgers players
Gigantes del Cibao players
Great Lakes Loons players
Gulf Coast Dodgers players
Leones de Yucatán players
Los Angeles Dodgers players
Major League Baseball pitchers
Major League Baseball players from the Dominican Republic
Mexican League baseball pitchers
Ogden Raptors players
Oklahoma City Dodgers players
Rancho Cucamonga Quakes players
Tigres de Quintana Roo players
Tulsa Drillers players